Orthomecyna alloptila is a moth of the family Crambidae. It is endemic to the island of Hawaii.

External links

Crambinae
Endemic moths of Hawaii